The Programme commun (or 'Common Programme') was a reform programme, signed 27 June 1972 by the Socialist Party, the French Communist Party and the centrist Radical Movement of the Left, which provided a great upheaval in the economic, political and military fields in France. That alliance opened a political repositioning for the left that lasted 30 years, contributing particularly to the election of François Mitterrand in the presidential election of 1981. Between 1981 and 1983, he began putting Programme commun into action.

The Keynesian-inspired policies led to an increase in the fiscal deficit and the trade deficit. To keep France in the European Monetary System, a different approach was needed.

In March 1983, Mitterrand did a U-turn by cancelling the parts of Programme commun that had been already passed, which was sometimes referred to as the "austerity turn".

Projects 
 "Living better, changing lives": Reduction of working hours (down to 40 hours per week), higher wages, social security expansion, socialised housing.
 Compensated nationalisation of major industrial companies in the key sectors, of 38 banks and financial institutions, increased market regulation, worker participation in company decisions
 Decentralisation and "democratisation" of government institutions, guarantee of individual liberties, restriction of police custody
 Fight against unemployment
 "Politics of peace": abolishing nuclear deterrent, military service reduction to 6 months, dissolution of both NATO and the Warsaw Pact
 Education reform

References

History of the French Communist Party
Party platforms
Socialist Party (France)
1972 documents
1972 in France